The Light That Failed is a lost 1916 silent film produced and directed by Edward José and starring Robert Edeson and Jose Collins. It was based on the 1891 novel of the same name by Rudyard Kipling and had been performed on the Broadway stage by Johnston Forbes-Robertson and Gertrude Elliott in 1904. It was distributed by Pathé Exchange.

It was filmed at Fayerweather Island, Bridgeport, Connecticut.

Cast
Robert Edeson - Dick Hedlar
Jose Collins - Bessie, the Model
Lillian Tucker - Maizie
Claude Fleming - Torpenhow (*aka Claude Flemming)

References

External links

1916 films
American silent feature films
Lost American films
American black-and-white films
Silent American drama films
1916 drama films
Films based on works by Rudyard Kipling
1916 lost films
Lost drama films
Films directed by Edward José
1910s American films